Louis Marie Joseph Etienne Rollin (27 March 1879 – 3 November 1952) was a French politician who was a minister in several cabinets in the period between the two world wars.

Early years (1879–1919)

Louis Marie Joseph Etienne Rollin was born on 27 March 1879 in Uzerche, Corrèze.
He studied classics in Limoges before moving the Paris where he obtained his law degree at the age of 21.
He became an attorney at the Paris court of appeal, and would retain this position throughout his political career.
Rollin joined the Republican Federation (Fédération républicaine) and in 1910 was elected municipal councilor for the 6th arrondissement of Paris, and councilor-general for the Seine.
He ran for election to the legislature in 1914 but was defeated in the second round.
He volunteered for the army during World War I (1914–18) and was awarded the Croix de Guerre and the Legion of Honour.

Inter-war politics (1919–39)

After the war Rollin became vice-president of the general council of the Seine.
On 16 November 1919 he was elected deputy for the 3rd district of the Seine on the platform of the Entente républicaine et démocratique (Democratic and Republican Alliance). 
He joined the Républicains de gauche (Left Republicans) in the chamber.
He was reelected in 1924, 1928, 1932 and 1936.
He became a member of the committee of Foreign Affairs, on which he sat until 1940, and other committees.
He had liberal views, and aimed to rebuild the country after the war, while respecting freedom, maintaining peace and protecting the weak.

Rollin was Minister of Merchant Marine in two successive governments of André Tardieu between 3 November 1929 and 12 December 1930.
He authorized construction of the liner SS Normandie, which became the pride of the French passenger fleet.
Rollin was a member of three cabinets led by Pierre Laval between 27 January 1931 and 20 February 1932 as Minister of Commerce and Industry .
After the fall of the Laval government he was Minister of Commerce, Posts, Telegraphs and Telephones in the cabinet of  André Tardieu from 20 February to 3 June 1932.
He was Minister of Colonies from 13 October 1934 to 24 January 1936 in the successive governments of Gaston Doumergue, Pierre-Étienne Flandin, Fernand Bouisson and Pierre Laval.

During 1933 and 1934 Rollin was among those who worked hard to find places at French universities for Jewish scholars fleeing Nazi persecution in Germany.
In 1938 he petitioned the government to stop jailing Jewish refugees on the grounds that it was counterproductive and inhumane.
In the Spring of 1939 he pleaded with the government to implement the amnesty plan under which Jewish refugees could "reconstruct their lives on a dignified and stable foundation ... in France or elsewhere."

World War II (1939–45)

During World War II (1939–45) Rollin was Minister of Commerce and Industry in the cabinet of Paul Reynaud from 21 March 1940 to 16 May 1940.
He was then Minister of the Colonies from 18 May 1940 to 16 June 1940.
He opposed signature of the armistice after the German invasion of France, but on 10 July 1940 voted in favor of giving Marshal Philippe Pétain full executive powers.
After the constitutional changes of 11 July 1940 he broke with the Vichy government.

Rollin returned from Vichy to occupied Paris on 30 July 1940.
He came into contact with the French Resistance group Ceux de la Libération-Vengeance, and transmitted military intelligence to the allies with the aid of the engineer Pierre Schnell, who had a secret transmitter.
As a councilor of Paris he obtained false papers and lodgings for escaped prisoners, resistance fighters whom the authorities were seeking and Jews. 
He hid weapons, and hosted "Colonel Rémy" (Gilbert Renault), deputy head of the Marco Polo network.

On 21 April 1944 Rollin and all others who voted for Pétain on 10 July 1940 were made ineligible to sit in parliament.
On 24 April 1945 a jury of honor chaired by René Cassin found against him since he could not provide evidence of his activity during the German occupation.
On 29 April 1945 Rollin was reelected councilor for the Seine.
The election was challenged and a new jury of honor heard his case.
This time Paul Reynaud, who had returned from Germany, spoke in his favor, as did Pierre Schnell, and the jury decided to remove his ineligibility.

Later career (1945–52)

After the draft constitution from the first constituent assembly was rejected in a referendum, Rollin ran for election for the second constituent assembly on the platform of the Parti républicain de la liberté (PRL, Republican Party of Liberty) and was elected on 2 June 1946 as deputy for the Seine.
Rollin and Frédéric Dupont headed the PRL list in the election for the first legislature of the French Fourth Republic, and were both reelected in November 1946.
Rollin was again elected on 17 June 1951 on a list of the Union des indépendants et des républicains nationaux (Union of Independents and National Republicans).
Louis Rollin died on 3 November 1952 in Paris.

Mandates

Rollin's mandates in the National Assembly or Chamber of Deputies were:

Publications

Notes

Sources

 

1879 births
1952 deaths
People from Corrèze
Politicians from Nouvelle-Aquitaine
Republican Federation politicians
Democratic Republican Alliance politicians
Republican Centre politicians
Republican Party of Liberty politicians
National Centre of Independents and Peasants politicians
French Ministers of Merchant Marine
French Ministers of Commerce, Industry, Posts, and Telegraphs
French Ministers of Overseas France
Members of the 12th Chamber of Deputies of the French Third Republic
Members of the 13th Chamber of Deputies of the French Third Republic
Members of the 14th Chamber of Deputies of the French Third Republic
Members of the 15th Chamber of Deputies of the French Third Republic
Members of the 16th Chamber of Deputies of the French Third Republic
Members of the Constituent Assembly of France (1946)
Deputies of the 1st National Assembly of the French Fourth Republic
Deputies of the 2nd National Assembly of the French Fourth Republic